Haemodorum austroqueenslandicum is a shrub native to Southeastern Australia.

References

austroqueenslandicum
Flora of New South Wales
Flora of Queensland
Taxa named by Karel Domin